Möngün-Taiga, also known as Mungun-Taiga ( - Silver Mountain) is a massif in Mongun-Taiga kozhuun, Russia. The Russian part of the Altay Mountains is considered part of Western Siberia, but Möngün-Taiga in 1932 was transferred (along with the north of Uvs Nuur Basin) from the Mongolian People's Republic of Tuva, and in 1944 became part of Eastern Siberia.

See also
 List of highest points of Russian federal subjects

References 

 Mangun-Taiga — Belarusian Encyclopedia. 18. 2000. Series 75. Retrieved 8 June 2012.

Mountain ranges of Russia
Districts of Tuva
Landforms of Tuva